Chris Payne may refer to:

Chris Payne (soccer) (born 1990), Australian soccer player
Chris Payne (musician) (born 1957), English musician
Chris Fox Payne or C. F. Payne, American caricaturist and illustrator
Chris Payne (born 1983), An Australian B2B Sales Expert based in Latin America.

See also
Chris Paine, American filmmaker and environmental activist